Marco Knaller (born 26 March 1987) is an Austrian goalkeeper who plays for Austria Klagenfurt.

Personal life
His father Wolfgang Knaller played as a goalkeeper, including for Austria national team.

References

External links

1987 births
Living people
Austrian footballers
Association football goalkeepers
Austria under-21 international footballers
FC Admira Wacker Mödling players
FC Lustenau players
1. FC Kaiserslautern II players
1. FC Kaiserslautern players
SV Sandhausen players
FC Ingolstadt 04 players
Wolfsberger AC players
FC Wacker Innsbruck (2002) players
SK Austria Klagenfurt players
2. Liga (Austria) players
Regionalliga players
2. Bundesliga players
3. Liga players
Austrian Football Bundesliga players
Austrian expatriate footballers
Expatriate footballers in Germany
Austrian expatriate sportspeople in Germany